In mathematics, and in particular the study of algebra, an Akivis algebra is a nonassociative algebra equipped with a binary operator, the commutator  and a ternary operator, the associator  that satisfy a particular relationship known as the Akivis identity. They are named in honour of Russian mathematician Maks A. Akivis.

Formally, if  is a vector space over a field  of characteristic zero, we say  is an Akivis algebra if the operation  is bilinear and anticommutative; and the trilinear operator  satisfies the Akivis identity:

It is known that all Akivis algebras may be represented as a subalgebra of a (possibly nonassociative) algebra in this way (for associative algebras, the associator is identically zero, and the Akivis identity reduces to the Jacobi identity).

References 
 M. R. Bremner, I. R. Hentzel, and L. A. Peresi 2005. "Dimension formulas for the free nonassociative algebra". Communications in Algebra 33:4063-4081.

Algebra